The Journalist is a 1967 Soviet romantic drama. It was directed and written by Sergei Gerasimov. The film stars Galina Polskikh and Yuri Vasilyev and tells a story of love between a successful Moscow journalist and a girl in a remote city in the Urals.

Plot
The film consists of two parts. In the first part entitled "Encounters" a successful journalist from Moscow Yuri Aliabiev (Y.Vasiliev) travels to a small city in the Urals because a certain Anikina, woman living in the city, writes complaints about local authorities accusing them of dissipation and bribe-taking. Arriving in the city Aliabiev meets Shura Okaemova, a nice-looking girl who works at a local plant. Attracted by Shura's intelligence and beauty Aliabiev attempts to seduce her but Shura rejects his attempts. Aliabiev leaves for Moscow and then on a business trip for Paris.

The second part ("Garden and Spring") tells about Aliabiev's life in Paris where he meets Annie Girardot, attends the rehearsal of Mireille Mathieu and conducts extensive discussions with his new friend, an American journalist, trying to persuade him in the advantages of Soviet way of life. Returning from Paris to Moscow Aliabiev travels to the city in the Urals again. He failed to forget Shura and wants to resume their relationship. On arriving to the city he finds out that Anikina wrote letters to local authorities accusing Shura of a liaison with him. The Komsomol meeting decided to move Shura from her house to a hostel. Aliabiev finds Sura to tell her about his love and they decide to marry.

Cast
 Yuri Vasilyev — Yuri Aliabiev
 Galina Polskikh — Shura Okaemova
 Nadezhda Fedosova — Anikina
 Sergei Nikonenko — Reutov
 Valentina Telichkina — Valya
 Vasily Shukshin — Evgeny Sergeyevich, journalist
 Anatoli Kryzhansky — Sid Barton, an American journalist
 Annie Girardot — Annie Girardot (cameo appearance)
 Mireille Mathieu — Mireille Mathieu (cameo appearance)
 Sergei Gerasimov — Alexei Kolesnikov
 Tamara Makarova — Olga Panina

Awards
The film was awarded the Grand Prix at 5th Moscow International Film Festival in 1967.

References

External links
 
 Яцко В. «Искусство четвёртой степени»
 Sergei Gerasimov
 Film The Journalist at the international movie database

1967 films
Soviet romantic drama films
1960s Russian-language films
1967 romantic drama films
Films directed by Sergei Gerasimov